Sergio Navarrete (6 November 1925 – 2011) was a Chilean alpine skier. He competed at the 1952 Winter Olympics and the 1956 Winter Olympics.

References

External links
 

1925 births
2011 deaths
Chilean male alpine skiers
Olympic alpine skiers of Chile
Alpine skiers at the 1952 Winter Olympics
Alpine skiers at the 1956 Winter Olympics
Sportspeople from Santiago
20th-century Chilean people